Saleh al-Rashed (born 1964) was the Minister of Education of Syria between 2011 and 2012.

Early life, education and career

Al-Rashed was born in the Aleppo Governorate in 1964. He earned a bachelor's degree in political science, economics and management, and a postgraduate diploma in international relations from the University of Aleppo.

During his time at the University of Aleppo:
1995-2005: lecturer in multiple colleges and institutes: Faculty of History, Education, Civil Engineering and the Institute of Mechanical and medium business, engineering and secretarial
2000: President of the Office of Information and Central Direction
2001-2003: President of the Office of External Relations
2003-2005: President of the Office of the setup and qualification frameworks
2005-2007: Head of Educational activities

2007: Director of Education in Aleppo Governorate
2011-2012: Chairman of the National Committee for Education, Culture and Science in Syria UNESCO.
2015-2019: Faculty Member in the University of Modern sciences –Dubai.
2016-2019: Assistant Professor in the Canadian University – Dubai.
2017-2019: Dean of College of Arts & Sciences in the University of Modern Sciences.
2019-now:  Head of International Relations Department at the Faculty of International Relations and Diplomacy at Al-Sham Private University.

Bibliography
He has had a number of papers published in periodicals and newspapers, and in 2005 wrote a book about Syria and the European Union and the Mediterranean area.

See also
Cabinet of Syria

References

Minister of Education Saleh al-Rashed, SANA
Biography of the new Syrian government 2011 - the names and lives of government ministers , Syria FM, 17 April 2011

External links
Ministry of Education official government website

1964 births
Living people
University of Aleppo alumni
Syrian ministers of education